Malolos Cathedral, formally known as the Minor Basilica and Cathedral of the Immaculate Conception of Malolos (Spanish: Basílica Menor y Catedral de la Inmaculada Concepción de Malolos, Filipino: Basilica Minore at Catedral ng Inmaculada Conception ng Malolos), is a historic church in the Philippines located in city of Malolos, the capital of the province of Bulacan. The cathedral is the see of the Bishop of Malolos, whose diocese is a suffragan of the Archdiocese of Manila.

Beginnings
Due to the defeat of the Hagonoy and Macabebe natives headed by Bambalito against Spanish conqueror Martin de Goiti and Juan Salcedo at the Battle of Bangkusay on June 3, 1571. The Spaniards pacified the northern villages of Manila. They arrived at the river banks of the Malolos River on November 14, 1571, and conceded the unnamed eight villages into the Encomienda of Malolos under Don Marcos de Herrera. On April 5, 1572, Legazpi aggregated the villages of Calumpit, Malolos, Bangkal (also in Malolos) Magong (now Paombong) under a single encomienda vis-a-vis pueblo under the name "Calumpit", administered jointly by Don Marcos de Herrera and Sargento Mayor Juan Moron

Also in April 1572 the Augustinian friars arrived at the bank of the Meyto River, headed by Diego de Herrera, but he was dispatched in Spain. On May 3, 1572, upon the election of the new Prior Provincial of the Augustinians,Martin de Rada overtook the administration of the Convento de Calumpit withDiego Ordoñez de Vivar as his parochial vicar, a native of Guadalajara, Mexico, established and accepted Calumpit wherein he Christianized and baptized the village of Meyto, Meysulao, Pandocot, and Calumpit. Vivar expanded the ecclesiastical missions to the villages of Malolos and Hagonoy. It is simplified to say that also on this period Malolos was annexed as one of the visitas and mission (sub-parishes) of the Calumpit in Bulacan Eight years later on June 11, 1580, Malolos Church was recognized as a separate town and parish having three visitas namely Paombong, Matimbo and Mambog with Matheo de Mendoza as its first Curate (Conquistas delas Islas Philipinas of Gaspar de San Agustin) while Binto 'y Quingua on the other hand according to Galende's Angeles in Stone, included later as its visita on May 21, 1599, but an earlier date appear according to a document on Report to the King of Spain made by Governor General Luis Perez Dasmariñas in June 1591 it appears Binto as visita under the instruction of the Malolos Convent. On January 3, 1582, the Augustinian council fathers authorized the provincial to grant the town of Malolos to have its voting power to the provincial chapters. The Catalogo of 1591 indicates Malolos had one convent with three thousand six hundred (3,600) souls. In 1599, San Agustin Monastery in Intramuros asked Malolos prior, Roque de Barrionuevo to contribute an annual rent of fifteen pesos, twenty bushels of rice and sixty chickens.

Owing to the frequent flooding of its first and second location, the church was moved to a higher location from time to time. The hermitage were initially built made of cogon and bamboo materials in early 1573 at the banks of the Liang River. Transferred later on the site now called Bangkal (today San Agustin-Caingin area) and in 1578–1579 it was transferred to Mambog where the prominent tree named Kalumpang once stood. It became "Poblacion" in sometime in 1673 when the exact boundaries of the town was demarcated and configured. The town church made of light material where later enlarged in the year 1590 under the curacy of Cristobal Tarique, when Fray. Roque de Barrionuevo assigned to the town he brought a wooden image of Saint Roque, he started the construction of the bigger church in 1599 and at the same date he built the Chapel of Mambog.

The Estado of 1612 mentions that the Malolos convent had two priests and 2,100 souls. In 1630, Mateo de Braceros started to build a church made of hewn stone, and it was continuously built under the town friars throughout, namely Agustin Carreno in 1635, Juan de Trezo in 1638 and Andres Jimenez in 1639. In the same year, Jimenez donated two bells weighing 39 kilograms and 2 kilograms in Superior Gobierno in Intramuros for the campaign of Governor General Corcuerra against Muslims (Galende). Construction was continued by Sandro Moncada and was slightly interrupted due to the revolt of Don Pedro Ladia in 1640 at the term of Cristobal Enriquez. Lorenzo Figueroa continued construction from 1641 to 1653. Works were nearly finished in 1669 under Francisco Martinez. In 1671, the church were almost done by the time of Ildefonso Tellez in 1672 and Jaime Balzac (restored as Malolos curate) and Francisco Lopez applied the few finishing touches, and the first ever stone church of Malolos was finished in 1673. In 1732, the Malolos convent had four thousand four hundred ninety-one souls. In 1760, it had seven thousand six-hundred twenty-four souls. The Intermediate Meeting of the Augustinians of 1763 was held in the Malolos convent establishing the Prior of Pulilan.

However, both the church and the convent were totally destroyed by fire in 1813.

Construction of the present church

The construction of the present church was started in 1814 and completely finished in 1817 under Fray. Melchor Fernández. An embossed stone marker was installed in the main portal of the church depicting ANOD1817. It was consecrated by Ilmo. Francisco Albán, Bishop of Nueva Segovia (Vigan) on October 18, 1826, the only stone church consecrated in the archipelago at that time.Fernandez also a prolific builder was also responsible for the addition of arches to the convent; the fortification of the belfry to accommodate the installation of a clock; and the construction of the stone bridge connecting Malolos with Barasoain. However, the convent were destroyed and the main church with minor damages by a strong earthquake in 1863. Fray. Ezekiel Merino and Don Luciano Oliver, a prominent Manila architect at that time undertook the reconstruction of the interior and collapsed structures which lasted until 1872.

Another severe earthquake took place in 1880 which destroyed the convent.Juan Tombo began the restoration of the convent in 1883. It was completed in 1884 byFelipe Garcia.

The convent as the presidential palace
The Malolos Cathedral convent served as the presidential palace of Emilio Aguinaldo, during the First Philippine Republic from September 15, 1898, to March 31, 1899. Aguinaldo used the convent as his office.

During the Philippine–American War, the US Army decided to strategize their "Northern Campaign" by moving the US soldiers forward to Malolos in order to defeat the Filipino forces in town. Aguinaldo and his men decided to escape before the American Army arrived in the capital. While escaping to San Fernando, Pampanga, Aguinaldo ordered General Antonio Luna to burn down the Malolos Church, as part of his scorched earth policy so that anything left would be rendered useless.

Church rebuilding

From the ashes of war, the church was rebuilt from 1902 to 1936. Starting in the mid 20th-century major changes were made to the church beginning in the 1950s when the entrance to the church was made into three doors. Prior to this renovation, the structure had only one door at the center.  
 
Under the curacy of Pedro Abad, the baptistery was built and blessed by the Archbishop of Manila Rufino Cardinal Santos on February 28, 1954. The pews were acquired in 1957 by Marcelino Montemayor and the roof was replaced during the time of Francisco Domingo.

Elevation to a cathedral
The Malolos Church became a cathedral with the creation of the Diocese of Malolos and the installation of its first diocesan bishop, Most Reverend Manuel del Rosario D.D., in March 1962.

Other renovations

With the reforms of the Second Vatican Council, Virgilio Soriano commissioned a new altar in 1967.

Another major renovation of the cathedral happened in 1970. Prior to this renovation, the cathedral's bell tower was a topped with a triangular cone, as seen on the old picture taken mostly during the Philippine–American War from 1898 to 1899. In 1970, the triangular cone that previously topped the bell tower was removed and replaced by a concrete statue of the Immaculate Conception, donated by Amparo Bautista-Julian.

When the cathedral together with the new bishop palace was again consecrated by Papal Nuncio Bruno Torpigliani DD on December 4, 1976, the communion rail was dismantled, and the sanctuary was renovated with stained glass windows. The old convent was reconstructed and expanded to accommodate the bishop's residence, chancery office and parish convent. During the incumbency of Macario Manahan, the St. Joseph Social Hall was built; the old baptistery was transformed into a mortuary chapel; and a crypt was constructed below the main altar.

Elevation to a minor basilica
When Rolando Tria-Tirona became bishop and moderator of the Team Ministry, renovations and repairs were undertaken like the Diocesan Hall being refurbished into the Mary Magdalene Hall. It was under the tenure of Bishop Tirona that the cathedral was elevated into the Minor Basilica of the Immaculate Conception on December 4, 1999. The fourth bishop, Jose Oliveros, continued to make improvements especially with the church patio and its environs. The statues under the Kalayaan tree, the memorial cross fronting the Basilica and the Presidential Gate constituted different phases which are connected with the Patio Development Plan.

Style and design

The predominant feature of the cathedral basilica is the semi-circular arch in its lower part. The ornamentation is moderate; the massing is well balanced and the symmetrical movement of the columns and openings are almost neoclassic. The façade is divided by single and coupled Doric columns in three segments, and is dominated by large semi-circular arches of the openings in the first level, and the smaller ones superimposed on the second level which are alternately semicircular and segmented. The triangular pediment strongly outlined by heavily projecting broken cornices is topped by a sort of acroteria in the center and torch-like finials. A statued niche flanked by fluted pilasters topped by a segmented canopy crowns the silted frame of the center window. Triglypha decorate the frieze and a stylized Augustinian emblem decorates the center of pediment. The over-all impression is one of the neatness of line, counterbalanced by the dramatic circular of the openings.

The image of the Immaculate Conception at the main altarpiece

According to reliable information, the statue of the Immaculate Concepcion was made before the Second World War. The work is attributed to Donding Ople, a gifted artist who was orphaned at a very tender age. The original work is kept in an undisclosed place but the statue at the high enclosure behind the main altar is the perfect replication of the original. Many of the devotees flock to the image of the Immaculate Concepcion. Additionally it is the second attractive church in Malolos, Bulacan

The miraculous image of Our Lady of the Immaculate Conception

The miraculous image of Our Lady enshrined at the main altar was carved by a certain Donding Ople in 1950. Due to the miracles attributed in devotion to the Immaculate Conception, the Malolos curate decided to produce some replicas. An elite replica of the said statue was first displayed at the right of the sanctuary, at the middle, and beside the statues of Saint Joachim at Saint Peter patriarch.

The devotion to Immaculate Conception seems to be very effective and so to enrich the faith of the Maloleños, a set of stairs was attached to the altar so the people may go and touch the statue. This action was made under the time of then rector, Jojo Galvez with Fathers Ron Cristobal and Francis Protacio S. Cortez III as members. Also around this time, the statue was officially named "Virgen Inmaculada Concepcion de Malolos" (Our Virgin of Immaculate Conception of Malolos).

In their tenure, a replica of the image was placed in front of the Adoration Chapel's Capella Sanctorum (Chapel of the Saints). The statue is placed in the middle of the highest elevation and is connected down with a set of stairs. Next to the entrance stair is a "Prayer Requests" book where devotees write their prayers. Next to the exit stairs is the "Answered prayers" book where devotees were write their own experiences of divine intervention through the said statue.

The canonical coronation and the golden jubilee

Due to popularity of miraculous attributes, a petition was made for the canonical coronation of the image at the main altar of Malolos Cathedral. In May 2009, the Vatican granted the petition for the canonical coronation through a papal bull. The solemn canonical coronation was held on March 10, 2012. During the time of Jaime Garcia and Conrado "Badong" Santos Jr. and Renato "R.J." Brion (2009–present), renovations and refurbishments inside and outside the cathedral and its patio were started in preparation for the canonical coronation and the golden jubilee of the Diocese of Malolos. When Jaime Garcia died on June 4, 2011, Pablo S. Legaspi Jr. replaced him as rector, continuing and completing the needed refurbishments in preparation for the diocese's golden jubilee.

The Kalayaan Tree

The Kalayaan Tree (locally called Siar, a Yellow flame tree) is located at the patio of the cathedral. It is not certain that Aguinaldo planted this tree because it was already mature when the First Philippine Republic was established. The historical significance of this tree is that it is a living witness to the Malolos Republic. Aguinaldo and his Cabinet have conducted many political discussions there. Under the tree, a monument was placed symbolizing the meeting of Filipino revolutionaries, represented by Gen. Gregorio del Pilar and Gen. Isidoro Torres; Don Pablo Tecson, an erudite legislator; Padre Mariano Sevilla, a nationalist leader of the church and Doña Basilia Tantoco, portraying a woman freedom fighter.

Parish priests 1580–1961

From 1580 up to the present time, Malolos Cathedral has a long list of parish priests who administered the church. The list includes priests from the Augustinian Order and from the Archdiocese of Manila. Due to the antiquity of Malolos Church, the list of parish priests from 1580 to 1680 came from the catalog of Augustinian Province archive.

The list below is from the Malolos Cathedral Archive. Note that the Malolos Church was burned down in 1899, and records are incomplete. Malolos Cathedral recorded the list of priests only from 1673.

References

External links

Malolos Cathedral Facebook Page

Roman Catholic churches in Bulacan
Roman Catholic cathedrals in the Philippines
Basilica churches in the Philippines
Buildings and structures in Malolos
Spanish Colonial architecture in the Philippines
Roman Catholic churches completed in 1817
1580 establishments in the Philippines
19th-century Roman Catholic church buildings in the Philippines
Neoclassical church buildings in the Philippines
Churches in the Roman Catholic Diocese of Malolos